Westhay Heath is a 25.9 hectare (64.0 acre) biological Site of Special Scientific Interest 2km west of Westhay village in Somerset, notified in 1990.

Westhay Heath, which is managed by the Somerset Wildlife Trust is an area of tall fen vegetation containing scrub, marshy grassland, ditches and small ponds in the heart of the peat moors on the Somerset Levels. This mosaic of habitats has developed on areas previously used for peat extraction. The site is of importance for the presence of a nationally rare fen community, including a diverse assemblage of breeding and wintering birds.

References

External links 

Sites of Special Scientific Interest in Somerset
Sites of Special Scientific Interest notified in 1990
Nature reserves in Somerset
Somerset Levels
Wetland Sites of Special Scientific Interest